Sommers is an islet and a lighthouse in the eastern part of the Gulf of Finland, an arm of the Baltic Sea, just outside the Gulf of Vyborg, about 19 kilometres south of Virolahti, Finland, but it is now possessed by Russia. The lighthouse is situated on a rocky skerry, which is elevated a maximum of 16 metres above the Baltic Sea.

History
The first lighthouse on this islet was built in 1808. That construction was a brick building, chalked in white, about five metres high, with a lanternine on its top. The light source was modernized in 1866, and it was also raised to an elevation of eight metres. The lighthouse was given a third class lens system and a clockwork which rotated an oil lamp with a double wick. This gave the lighthouse beacon a reddish gloom.

The lighthouse men lived along with their families in a wooden house next to the lighthouse. A fog horn was constructed at the other end of the island by the beginning of the 20th century. The Imperial Russian Army began constructing defense works on this island when World War I erupted, but these were never completed. In 1918, Finnish maritime authorities manned the lighthouse.

The old lighthouse was destroyed before the Winter War of 1939-40 and the personnel were evacuated. On New Year's Eve of 1941 a Finnish force of about 100 men was stationed at the island since it had a strategic position. The Soviet Union also wanted to possess the islet, and on 8 July 1942 it attacked the islet with several small warships and aircraft.

After the 1944 peace treaty between Finland and the Soviet Union, the island of Sommers was given to the Soviets, who also constructed a new truss lighthouse. Its light characteristic is "Fl(2) 10s", i.e. a group of two flashing lights about every ten seconds. There are also a number of buildings and radar masts on the island, probably to keep an eye on the increasingly busy shipping traffic in the area.

See also

 List of lighthouses in Russia

References

Sources 

 Seppo Laurell: Finlands fyrar 1999, 
 

Lighthouses completed in 1808
Towers completed in 1808
Lighthouses completed in 1866
Lighthouses in Russia
Russian islands in the Baltic
Skerries
1866 establishments in the Russian Empire